Atanas Atanasov may refer to:

Atanas Atanasov (basketball) (1935–2021), Bulgarian basketball player
Atanas Atanasov (footballer, born 1985), Bulgarian footballer
Atanas Atanasov (long jumper) (born 1956), Bulgarian retired long jumper
Atanas Atanasov (runner) (born 1945), Bulgarian retired runner
Atanas Atanasov (cyclist) (1904–?), Bulgarian cyclist
Atanas Atanasov (footballer, born 1969), Bulgarian footballer and football coach and manager
Atanas Atanasov (wrestler) (born 1963), Bulgarian Olympic wrestler
Atanas Atanasov (politician) (born 1959) Bulgarian politician